Jan Fransz (24 May 1937 – 18 December 2021) was a Dutch professional football player and coach.

Career
Fransz played as a midfielder for DVOS, Ajax, Blauw-Wit, FC Amsterdam, RCH, HFC Haarlem, SHS and Holland Sport, retiring from professional play at the age of 39. He won the Eredivisie title and KNVB Cup with Ajax, and the Eerste Divisie title with Haarlem.

He later worked as a coach, including as an assistant at HFC Haarlem, and as assistant manager, scout, and caretaker manager at AZ. He also managed amateur club AFC '34, winning promotion with the club.

Fransz died on 18 December 2021, at the age of 84.

References

1937 births
2021 deaths
Dutch footballers
AFC Ajax players
Blauw-Wit Amsterdam players
FC Amsterdam players
Racing Club Heemstede players
HFC Haarlem players
SVV Scheveningen players
Eredivisie players
Eerste Divisie players
Association football midfielders
Dutch football managers
HFC Haarlem non-playing staff
AZ Alkmaar non-playing staff
AZ Alkmaar managers
Association football coaches
AFC '34 managers
Footballers from Amsterdam